is a Japanese television series which premiered on Fuji TV on July 21, 2008. The series starred Yūji Oda as Sakutaro Sakurai, the homeroom teacher of Third Year's Class 1 (class 3-1).

The television series was broadcast as part of the Fuji TV's Getsuku time slot, which airs every Monday from 9pm to 9:54pm. The drama had an average viewership of 14.8% throughout its run.

Plot
At a particular private senior high school in Shōnan, Kanagawa Prefecture, 3rd year students are preparing for their university entrance examinations. Sakutaro is brought into the school by the principal in anticipation of the fallout from a scandal involving the school. However, his unorthodox methods of teaching and his emphasis on values is met with stiff resistance from his students, who are only interested in improving their academic results. His unorthodox approach also creates friction between him and the rest of the staff.

After helping his students with their various difficulties and imparting values to them in the process, Sakutaro's students begin to respect him as a teacher. The students also begin to realise the importance of pursuing their dreams rather than blindly following a successful path set by society. Together, the class grow as people and are able to tackle the many challenges that they faced. Sensing the growth of the students, the other members of the staff begin to question their previous fixation on grades and instead support Sakutaro's teaching methods.

Cast
 Yūji Oda as 
The homeroom teacher of class 3-1 and a Japanese language teacher. He is an economics graduate from Tokyo University, and obtained an MBA from Stanford University when he was just 24 years old. When he was on a job assignment in Africa, he was so moved by a native boy's desire to learn that he changed profession to become a teacher. He was invited by principal Kyoka to teach at the high school. Due to his background, his teaching philosophy differs from other teachers as he emphasises values over grades. This has led to disputes with other staff members, and in particular, chairman Kamiya.
 Keiko Kitagawa as 
The assistant homeroom teacher of class 3-1 and daughter of Kyoka. Although she is a graduate from Tokyo University, she became a teacher because she does not know what she wants to do in her life. Initially critical of Sakutaro's teaching methods, she gradually came to respect his teaching methods.
 Tetsuhiro Ikeda as Yasunori Akagi
 Michiko Kichise as Haruka Mayama
 Keiko Toda as Kyoka Hasebe, the principal of Shonan High School
 Fumiyo Kohinata as Ryunosuke Kamiya
The chairman of the school management committee

Students
 Kie Kitano as 
A close friend of Hiroki since elementary school and subsequently his girlfriend. Her family owns the cafe "CAFE SEA-LASS", a popular hangout for students in class 3-1. Her childhood is played by Nana Shirasaka
 Masaki Okada as Hiroki Negishi
 Gaku Hamada - Hachiro Tabata
 Yuriko Yoshitaka - Akari Yashima
 Satoshi Tomiura as Yamato Kusunoki
 Akira Kagimoto as Moichi Higaki
 Mitsuki Tanimura as Hana Sawamiju
 Yusuke Yamamoto as Eiji Kawabe
 Manami Kurose as Yuna Takabayashi
 Yuichi Nakamura as Masayuki Misaki
 Aya Omasa - Yukino Tsugihara
 Kento Kaku as Keigo Banno
 Atsuko Maeda as Mayu Hunaki
 Shiori Kutsuna as Risa Huzisawa

References

External links
  

Japanese drama television series
2008 Japanese television series debuts
2008 Japanese television series endings
Coming-of-age television shows
Fuji TV dramas
Japanese high school television series
Television shows written by Yûji Sakamoto